National Unity Day is celebrated in India on 31 October. It was introduced by the Government of India in 2014. The day is celebrated to mark the birth anniversary of Sardar Vallabhbhai Patel who had a major role in the political integration of India.

Objective and pledge
The official statement for National Unity Day by the Home Ministry of India cites that the National Unity Day "will provide an opportunity to re-affirm the inherent strength and resilience of our nation to withstand the actual and potential threats to the unity, integrity, and security of our country."

On the day, a pledge is read out in government offices:

31 October is also celebrated as  Rashtriya Sankalp Diwas or National Pledge Day as it marks the day of assassination of Indira Gandhi. Several schools and colleges, especially in Congress-run states, organize rallies and programmes in remembrance of Indira Gandhi.

See also
 National Pledge Day
 Ekta Yatra

References

External links

 
Modi administration initiatives
2014 introductions
Vallabhbhai Patel
October observances
Recurring events established in 2014
Observances in India
Memorials to Vallabhbhai Patel
2014 establishments in India